Battleship Promontory is a sandstone promontory which rises from the floor of Alatna Valley near its head, in Victoria Land, Antarctica. The name was suggested by Parker Calkin, U.S. geologist who made stratigraphic studies in the valley in the 1960–61 season.

References
 

Promontories of Antarctica
Landforms of Victoria Land
Scott Coast